Elvira Bierbach is a German heilpraktiker, an alternative medicine practitioner, health educator, writer and editor of related non-fiction books. Since 1992, she has been the director of Heilpraktikerschule Bierbach, a school for alternative medicine in Bielefeld, North Rhine-Westphalia. Bierbach has written and edited alternative medicine books, textbooks, and has lectured in the field. She has published the trade journal Deutsche Heilpraktiker Zeitschrift, and has engaged in related social and political developments.

Career 
Bierbach first trained to become a tailor. She became interested in alternative medicine, and took her exam as heilpraktiker in 1991. After running her own practice, she took over a private naturopathic school in Bielefeld in 1992, expanded it and named it Heilpraktikerschule Bierbach. In 1995, the school was accredited as Verbandsschule by the Bund Deutscher Heilpraktiker (BDH), the union of heilpraktiker in Germany. It is one of few BDH certified schools. She became a member of the organisation's advisory board, and has engaged in social and political organizations related to the field. 

She has written and edited several books on the subject of alternative medicine including Naturheilpraxis Heute (Practice of natural healing), and has lectured in the field. A revised version of Naturheilpraxis Heute, with an added Lernkompass to help with examinations, appeared in 2021. 

Bierbach is editor (Herausgeberin) of the trade journal, Deutsche Heilpraktiker Zeitschrift (German heilpraktiker newspaper). She is responsible for outreach for the Gesamtkonferenz Deutscher Heilpraktikerverbände und Fachgesellschaften, a union of associations of heilpraktiker.

Publications

References

External links 
 
 Elvira Bierbach Narayana Verlag (for homeopathy and natural healing)
 10 Jahre DHZ – Geburtstagsgrüße (in German) thieme.de
 Heilpraktikerbuch – auch für Ärzte (in German) in Ärzte Zeitung, genios.de, 2001

Heilpraktiker
Health educators
German health and wellness writers
People in alternative medicine
People from Bielefeld

Living people
Year of birth missing (living people)